Carboneras is a municipality of Almería province, in the autonomous community of Andalusia, Spain.

Demographics

References

External links
  Carboneras - Sistema de Información Multiterritorial de Andalucía
  Carboneras - Diputación Provincial de Almería
 Maps of Carboneras - Satellite relief maps and aerial photography

Municipalities in the Province of Almería